The Hong Kong Affairs Society was a middle class and professionals oriented political organisation formed in 1984 for the discussion for the Hong Kong prospect and political constitution after the handover to China with about 20 members led by Huang Chen-ya, Man Sai-cheong and liberal lawyer Albert Ho and grew to about 120 in 1987. It was established as a group of political commentary but increasingly involved in subsequent municipal and district boards elections. In the 1980s it was one of the three major pro-democracy groups (the other two being Hong Kong Association for Democracy and People's Livelihood and Meeting Point). In October 1986, the Society joined the Joint Committee on the Promotion of Democratic Government which consisted of about 190 organizations, putting forward to proposal of direct election in the 1988 Legislative Council election but was rejected. Its leader Albert Ho and most of its members later on joined the newly established United Democrats of Hong Kong in 1990.

Electoral performance

Municipal elections

District Board elections

See also
 List of political parties in Hong Kong

References

Political organisations based in Hong Kong
1984 establishments in Hong Kong
1990 disestablishments in Hong Kong